The 2014 Women's U23 Pan-American Volleyball Cup was the second edition of the bi-annual women's volleyball tournament, played by eight countries from September 7–13, 2013 in Ica and Chincha Alta, Peru. At the end of the tournament, the top two teams from NORCECA and the best placed of the CSV qualified for 2015 FIVB Volleyball Women's U23 World Championship, to be held in Ankara, Turkey. Colombia (CSV), Cuba and Dominican Republic (NORCECA) qualified for the World Championship.

Competing Nations

Pool standing procedure
Match won 3–0: 5 points for the winner, 0 point for the loser
Match won 3–1: 4 points for the winner, 1 points for the loser
Match won 3–2: 3 points for the winner, 2 points for the loser
The first criterion is the number of matches won, second criterion is points gained by the team
In case of tie, the teams were classified according to the criteria points ratio and sets ratio.

Preliminary round
 Venues:  Ica and Chincha Alta, Peru
 All times are Peruvian Standard Time (UTC−05:00)

Pool A (Ica)

Note: Peru finished with a 3–0 record and 11 points and in front of Argentina (2–1, 12 points).

Pool B (Chincha Alta)

Final round

Championship bracket (Ica)

5th to 8th places bracket (Chincha Alta)

Quarterfinals

Classificantion 5th at 8th

Semifinals

7th place

5th place

3rd place

Final

Final standing

Jineiry Martínez,
Gaila González,
Vielka Peralta,
María Yvett García,
Natalia Martínez,
María Angelica Hinojosa,
Yokaty Pérez,
Celenia Toribio,
Yonkaira Peña,
Larysmer Martínez (L),
Lisbeth Rosario,
Brayelin Martínez,

Individual awards

Most Valuable Player

Best Scorer

Best Spiker

Best Blocker

Best Setter

Best Opposite

Best Libero

Best Digger

Best Receiver

Best Server

References

Women's Pan-American Volleyball Cup
Women's U23 Pan-American Volleyball Cup
Women's U23 Pan-American Volleyball Cup
2014 Women's U23 Pan-American Volleyball Cup